Baemsillang: Gureongdeongdeong sinseonbi (Hangul: 뱀신랑: 구렁덩덩신선비; English: The Snake Husband: The Divine Serpent Scholar) is a Korean folktale about a woman married to a snake (baem) who breaks a promise with her husband (sillang) and conquers adversity to reunite with him. This tale of a snake shedding its skin to become a man is also known as Gureongdeongdeong sinseonbi in Korea, which means "divine serpent scholar." The hardships the wife endures while searching for her husband is regarded by some as analogous to a priest attempting to once more receive a deity.

History 
Baemsillang adopted a narrative pattern similar to the Cupid and Psyche myth. According to the Aarne-Thompson classification of folktales, the story can be considered a Korean version of Type 425: The Search for the Lost Husband. Baemsillang was passed down orally in more than forty-five variations throughout Korea. Some were included in major Korean folktale collections such as Hanguk gubi munhak daegye, or the Compendium of Korean Oral Literature.

Synopsis

Summary 
Once upon a time, there lived an old couple. One day, the old wife finally became pregnant, giving birth to a snake. The old wife kept the snake in the backyard. One of the neighbors happened to have three daughters who decided to pay a visit upon hearing rumors that the old woman next door had given birth. However, discovering that a snake had been born, they were all disgusted except for the youngest daughter. Upon witnessing the snake, the third daughter said the old woman had given birth to a divine serpent scholar. When the snake grew up, it begged its mother to propose his marriage to one of their neighbor's daughters. The mother went next door to propose, but the eldest and second daughters refused. The third daughter accepted the proposal and married the snake.

On their wedding night, the snake asked his bride to prepare a crock of soy sauce, a crock of flour, and a crock of water. The snake then slid into the crock of soy sauce, rolled about in the crock of flour, and finally bathed in the crock of water. When it came out, the snake had shed its skin and turned into a handsome scholar. The bride's elder sisters grew jealous when they saw that their younger sister was living with such an exceptionally handsome gentleman.

One day, the snake husband made his wife promise not to show anyone his skin and went off to take the government service examination in Seoul. Unfortunately, the wife's elder sisters came over to secretly search for the snakeskin and burned it. Sensing from Seoul that his skin had been burned, the serpent scholar disappeared. When her husband failed to return home, the wife set out to look for him. On her way, she met a crow, a wild boar, a woman doing laundry and a farmer plowing the field and did what each of them asked her to do in order to learn of her husband's whereabouts.

By the time the wife caught up with him, the serpent scholar had already remarried and was living with another woman. He decided to give tasks to the two women and stay with the one who performed them better. The tasks involved challenges like chopping firewood, drawing water, and sneaking a hair from a tiger's eyebrow, which the first wife carried out successfully while the second wife did not. The serpent scholar thus left his second wife and went back to living happily ever after with his first wife.

Variation 
Alternate versions of this folktale gave a different account of the snake's birth, his marriage to the third daughter, and his reunion with her. The mother of the snake is either an old woman or a widow. The pregnancy comes either from picking up and eating the egg of an animal or from a monk poking her with a stick. One version illustrates how the daughter's father at first rejects the snake's proposal but later reluctantly accepts, because the snake threatened to ruin the whole family. Another version offers detailed descriptions about the snake shedding its skin or the snake husband's reunion with his first wife, only briefly covered in other versions. Details pertaining to the third daughter's journey in search of her lost husband also vary.

Features and significance 
The snake in Baemsillang is a mystical creature. In some versions of the tale, the snake threatens its mother that it will hold a fire in one hand, a knife in the other, and slide back into her womb if she does not propose his marriage to their neighbor's third daughter. This is another scene that makes sense only by assuming the snake is a deity. And since it is a deity, the mother is compelled to accede to her son's request.

The third daughter's recognition of the snake as a divine serpent scholar demonstrates her wisdom. Her first meeting with the snake could be seen as a deity's answer to her prayers. The third daughter's quest to find her husband after the burning of the snakeskin causes him to disappear signifies a process of attempting to welcome back a lost deity.

From the third daughter's point of view, her ordeals reflect female characters in Korean narrative literature. Her competition with the serpent scholar's new wife demonstrates the conflict between the wife and concubines due to polygamy. The third daughter's victory against the new wife represents the common female tendency to root for the wife to defeat concubines.

Similar folktales 
Baemsillang is a folktale like Sangsabaem (Hangul: 상사뱀; English: The Lovesick Snake) and Yaraeja (Hangul: 야래자; English: The Nocturnal Visitor) in which an animal shapeshifts into human form.

Comparison to other East Asian folktales
Korean scholarship sees a possible relationship between Korean tale Baemsillang and Japanese story Amewakahiko, since both pertain to stories about snake bridegrooms who marry human women, disappear and are sought after by their spouses. However, it is also claimed that the Korean tale passed down orally, while the Japanese story was a literary development of the Japanese medieval period. Another point of comparison lies in the wife's journey: in some versions of the Korean tale, she is guided by the helpers to the husband's realm, an underwater world, while in the Japanese tale she ascends to the heavenly abode.

In a Burmese tale titled The Snake Prince, a poor widow goes to the river bank to collect figs to earn money. One day, she notices a snake on the tree and asks it if it wants to marry one of her daughters, in exchanging for the figs. The snake drops all figs at the marriage proposal with the widow's youngest daughter, Mistress Youngest. The widow gets the figs and runs all the way home. The snake follows her and coils around the woman's body. The woman pleads to release her as she renews her proposals. The snake uncoils itself at the mention of the third daughter. The widow asks her daughters to comply with the snake, but only the youngest accepts. She and the snake marry, and they sleep at night, the maiden on her bed, the snake on a basket nearby. The maiden tells her mother that she has been having strange dreams about a handsome man that comes at night to their bed. That night, her mother spies the snake taking off his snakeskin and becoming a man. She seizes the opportunity to take the skin and burn it. The prince complains about his body burning, but his wife throws a pot of water on him. The tale continues with two variations on the follow up: a good ending, and a sad one.

Legacy 
The tale provided the Korean playwright Oh Young-jin with a motif for his play Maengjinsadaek gyeongsa (맹진사댁 경사 The Maengjinsa Family's Wedding Day), which criticizes the way humans obsess over external aspects such as looks, power, or familial ties instead of internal aspects.

See also
Tales about serpent bridegrooms
The Enchanted Snake
The Serpent Prince
The Green Serpent
Tulisa, the Wood-Cutter's Daughter
 Khastakhumar and Bibinagar
 Habrmani
 Yasmin and the Serpent Prince
Princess Himal and Nagaray
The Snake Prince
Champavati
 The Ruby Prince (Punjabi folktale)
Monyohe (Sotho)
Umamba (Zulu folktale)
Amewakahiko soshi
 The King of the Snakes

Footnotes

References 

Sources
 "Baemsillang," Compendium of Korean Oral Literature.
 "Baemsillang," Compendium of Korean Oral Literature.
 "The Sad Fate of the Snake Husband," Compendium of Korean Oral Literature.
 "The Wife Who Found Her Snake Husband and Lived Happily Ever After," Compendium of Korean Oral Literature.
 김환희 [Hwan Hee Kim]. "<구렁덩덩신선비>와 「아메와카히코조시」의 친연성에 관한 비교문학적인 고찰" [A Comparative Study of the Affinities between the Korean Folktale of “the Serpent Husband” and the Japanese Story of “Amewakahiko-zōshi” : a Study of <ATU 425 The Search for the Lost Husband> tales in Korea and Japan]. In: 민족문화연구 no. 63 (2014): 123-155. doi: 10.17948/kcs.2014..63.123

Further reading 
 "Gureongdeongdeong sinseonbi," Encyclopedia of Korean Language and Literature.
 "Baemsillang," Doosan Encyclopedia.
 "The Logic of the Fantastic Imagination," Textbook of Living Classical Literature.
 Seo Dae-seok, "Gureongdeongdeong sinseonbi," Encyclopedia of Korean Folk Literature.
 Choi Nae-ok, "Gureongdeongdeong sinseonbi," Encyclopedia of Korean Folk Culture.
 Seo Dae-seok, "Gureongdeongdeong sinseonbi: A Tale About a Serpent Scholar's Test and Recovery of Love," Reading Korean Classics.
 김균태 [Kim Gyun-tae]. [국내논문] 한ㆍ중ㆍ일(韓中日) 야래자형 설화의 비교 연구 (A Comparative Study on "Yareaja" type legend of Korea, China and Japan thee nations). 比較民俗學 = Asian Comparative Folklore v. 26, pp. 707-739, 2004. , 비교민속학회
 이시준 [Lee, Si-Jun], 장경남 [Kyung Nam Jang] and 황민호 [Min Ho Hwang]. "동아시아의 뱀신랑 유형 민담에 관한 비교고찰 -일본의「언니와 동생」유형을 중심으로-" [The Comparative study of the “Snake-husband” narratives in East Asia]. In:  일어일문학연구 94, no. 2 (2015): 125-144. doi: 10.17003/jllak.2015.94.2.125
 이지영 [Yi, Ji-Young]. "그 여자의 상사뱀, 그 남자의 상사뱀" [His Lovesick Serpent and Her Lovesick Serpent]. In: 여성문학연구 no. 53 (2021): 194-222. doi: 10.15686/fkl.2021..53.194
 이기대 [Lee, Gi-dae]. "<구렁덩덩신선비>의 심리적 고찰" [Psychological review on "Gurungdungdung Shinsunbee"]. In: 우리어문연구 no. 16 (2001): 311-341.
 김정은 [Jungeun Kim]. "금기를 통한 ‘신랑 되찾기’ 서사의 의미 고찰 -한국민담과 독일민담을 중심으로-" [A Study on the Meaning of Recovering Husband Epic through a Taboo -with Korean folktale and German folktale-]. In: 겨레어문학 no. 47 (2011): 5-31.
 이정훈 [Lee, Junghoon]. "구렁덩덩신선비 이야기의 일상적 영웅성: ‘허물(벗기)’과 관계성을 중심으로" [A Study on General Heroism of Gureongdeongdeong Sinseonbi Story: Focusing on Meaning of Heomeul and Building Relationship]. In: 국어문학 57, no. 57 (2014): 83-107. doi: 10.23016/kllj.2014.57.57.83
 류진아 [Jin Ah Ru]. "‘구렁덩덩 신선비’에 나타나는 여성의 스키마와 상흔" [Women’s Schema and Trauma in Korean Folktale, GureongDeongDeong SinSeonBi]. In: 한국학 39, no. 2 (2016): 31-56. doi: 10.25024/ksq.39.2.201606.31
 이홍란 [Lee, Hong-Lan]. "韓·中「뱀신랑」설화에 대한 構造分析" [Analyzing the structure on finding story]. 한국문예비평연구 no. 44 (2014): 157-180. doi: 10.35832/kmlc..44.201408.157

Korean folklore
Fictional snakes
Fiction about shapeshifting
ATU 400-459

ko:구렁덩덩 신선비